Parotocinclus cesarpintoi is a species of catfish in the family Loricariidae. It is native to South America, where it occurs in the Paraíba do Sul basin. The species reaches 4 cm (1.6 inches) SL.

References 

Otothyrinae
Fish described in 1939
Freshwater fish of Brazil